Pranay Sharma (born 16 March 1988) is an Indian first-class cricketer who plays for Rajasthan.

References

External links
 

1988 births
Living people
Indian cricketers
Rajasthan cricketers
Cricketers from Jaipur